Carrier is a surname, and may refer to:

 Albert Carrier (1919–2002), Italian-American actor
 Corey Carrier (born 1980), American child actor
 Darel Carrier (born 1940), American professional basketball player
 George F. Carrier (1918–2002), American mathematician and Professor Emeritus at Harvard University
 Jean-Baptiste Carrier (1756–1794), French Revolutionary
 Albert-Ernest Carrier de Belleuse (1824-1887), French sculptor
 Louis-Robert Carrier-Belleuse (1848–1913), French painter and sculptor
 Mark Carrier (wide receiver) (born 1965), American football player
 Mark Carrier (safety) (born 1968), American football player
 Richard Carrier (born 1969), American author
 Robert Carrier (chef) (1923–2006), American chef, restaurateur and cookery writer
 Robert Carrier (politician) (born 1941), Canadian politician
 Roch Carrier (born 1937), Canadian novelist and author
 Scott Carrier (born 1957), American author and radio producer
 William Carrier (born 1994), Canadian ice hockey player
 Willis Carrier (1876–1950), American inventor of air-conditioning
 Jerry Carrier (born 1948), American author

See also
 Carrier (disambiguation)
 Cartier (disambiguation)